was a town located in Sōraku District, Kyoto Prefecture, Japan.  The town was named for the old Yamashiro Province.

As of 2003, the town had an estimated population of 8,978 and a density of 366.00 persons per km². The total area was 24.53 km².

On March 12, 2007, Yamashiro, along with the towns of Kamo and Kizu (all from Sōraku District), was merged to create the city of Kizugawa.

External links
Official website 

Dissolved municipalities of Kyoto Prefecture